The UK Rock & Metal Albums Chart is a record chart which ranks the best-selling rock and heavy metal albums in the United Kingdom. Compiled and published by the Official Charts Company, the data is based on each album's weekly physical sales, digital downloads and streams. In 2004, there were 19 albums that topped the 52 published charts. The first number-one album of the year was Permission to Land, the debut studio album by The Darkness, which remained at number one for the opening week of the year at the end of a five-week run which began on 6 December 2003. The final number-one album of the year was Green Day's seventh studio album American Idiot, which spent the last nine weeks of the year (and the first nine weeks of 2005) at number one in its second spell of the year at the top of the chart.

The most successful album on the UK Rock & Metal Albums Chart in 2004 was Greatest Hits by Guns N' Roses, which spent a total of 12 weeks at number one over three spells, including a run of ten consecutive weeks between the week ending 27 March and the week ending 29 May. Greatest Hits was the best-selling rock and metal album of the year, ranking 11th in the UK End of Year Albums Chart. American Idiot also spent 12 weeks at number one in 2004, but was the 18th best-selling album of the year. Live in Hyde Park by Red Hot Chili Peppers was number one for five weeks, Evanescence's debut studio album Fallen topped the chart for four weeks, Permission to Land spent three weeks at number one, and Muse's Absolution and Papa Roach's Getting Away with Murder each spent two weeks at number one in 2004.

Chart history

See also
2004 in British music
List of UK Rock & Metal Singles Chart number ones of 2004

References

External links
Official UK Rock & Metal Albums Chart Top 40 at the Official Charts Company
The Official UK Top 40 Rock Albums at BBC Radio 1

2004 in British music
United Kingdom Rock and Metal Albums
2004